Happiness is the thirteenth studio album by electronic music musician Kid606, released in 2013 through Tigerbeat6. On the vinyl version of the album, "Tarsier Treehouse" is placed after "If I Am Only Allowed One Song On This Album With Cut Up Female Vocals Then This Song Is It".

Track listing

Personnel

Miguel De Pedro - Music, production
Sarah Zoraya - Design (Credited as SarahZoraya.com)

References

External links
 

2013 albums
Kid606 albums
Tigerbeat6 albums